is a junction passenger railway station in the city of Naka, Ibaraki, Japan operated by East Japan Railway Company (JR East).

Lines
Kami-Sugaya Station is served by the Suigun Line, and is located 10.1 rail kilometers from the official starting point of the line at Mito Station.  It is also the terminus for the Hitachi-Ōta spur line on the Suigun Line, connecting Mito with Hitachiōta.

Station layout
The station consists of one side platform and one island platform connected to the station building by a level crossing. The station has a Midori no Madoguchi staffed ticket office.

Platforms

History
Kami-Sugaya Station opened on November 16, 1896 as a station on the Ota Railway. The Ota Railway merged with the Mito Railway on October 21, 1901 and was nationalized on December 1, 1927. The station was absorbed into the JR East network upon the privatization of the Japanese National Railways (JNR) on April 1, 1987. A new station building was completed in January 2014.

Passenger statistics
In fiscal 2019, the station was used by an average of 734 passengers daily (boarding passengers only).

Surrounding area

Naka City Hall
Naka Post Office

See also
List of railway stations in Japan

References

External links

  JR East Station information 

Railway stations in Ibaraki Prefecture
Suigun Line
Railway stations in Japan opened in 1897
Naka, Ibaraki